Cham Shel is a village in Mishan Rural District, Mahvarmilani District, Mamasani County, Fars Province, Iran. At the 2006 census, its population was 25, in 7 families.

References 

Populated places in Mamasani County